The 1998 North Indian Ocean cyclone season was an active season in annual cycle of tropical cyclone formation. The season has no official bounds but cyclones tend to form between April and December. These dates conventionally delimit the period of each year when most tropical cyclones form in the northern Indian Ocean. There are two main seas in the North Indian Ocean—the Bay of Bengal to the east of the Indian subcontinent and the Arabian Sea to the west of India. The official Regional Specialized Meteorological Centre in this basin is the India Meteorological Department (IMD), while the Joint Typhoon Warning Center releases unofficial advisories. An average of four to six storms form in the North Indian Ocean every season with peaks in May and November. Cyclones occurring between the meridians 45°E and 100°E are included in the season by the IMD.

With eleven depressions and eight tropical cyclones, this was one of the most active seasons in the ocean along with 1987, 1996, and 2005. The season caused a large loss of life, most of which was from one storm. Over 10,000 people were killed in India when Tropical Cyclone 03A brought a  storm surge to the Kathiawar Peninsula, inundating numerous salt mines. Total damages from the storm amounted to Rs. 120 billion (US$3 billion). Tropical Cyclone 01B killed at least 26 people and left at least 4,000 fishermen missing in eastern Bangladesh on May 20. A short lived depression in mid-October killed 122 people after triggering severe flooding in Andhra Pradesh. In November, Tropical Cyclone 06B killed six people and caused property damage worth BTN 880 million (US$20.7 million) in eastern India. An additional 40 people were killed and 100 fishermen were listed as missing after Tropical Cyclone 07B affected Bangladesh.



Season summary 

The first storm of the season developed on May 18 out of an area of low pressure over the Bay of Bengal. It reached its peak intensity with winds of  before making landfall near Chittagong, Bangladesh. The storm dissipated shortly after. Later that month, a short-lived storm developed over the Arabian Sea and dissipated the next day without impacting land. The most intense storm of the season formed in early June off the southwestern coast of India. It slowly traveled towards the west, remaining relatively weak before turning towards the north and intensifying. The storm reached its peak intensity with winds of  shortly before making landfall near Porbandar in the Indian state of Gujarat. The cyclone rapidly dissipated on the same day.

After three months of inactivity, five storms developed in late September and October. Two of them strengthened into tropical storms, neither of which impacted land. In early November, the sixth tropical cyclone of the season developed in the Bay of Bengal. The storm rapidly dissipated the same day it made landfall. Shortly after 06B dissipated, the remnants of Tropical Storm Chip triggered the development of a new cyclone over the Bay of Bengal. The cyclone entered an area of higher wind shear shortly after and rapidly weakened before making landfall. Then it dissipated in Bangladesh. The final cyclone of the season developed in the Arabian Sea during mid-December. It reached its peak intensity with winds of  before weakening due to strong wind shear. It made landfall in Oman on December 17 as a minimal tropical storm shortly before dissipating.

Systems

Severe Cyclonic Storm BOB 01 (01B) 

The first cyclone in the region developed as a tropical disturbance on May 13 over the southern Bay of Bengal to the southeast of Sri Lanka. With little development, the disturbance initially traveled towards the north-northeast before turning west. On May 16, the system slowed down near the southeastern coast of India and began to turn towards the northeast once more. At 0700 UTC on May 17, the Joint Typhoon Warning Center (JTWC) issued a Tropical Cyclone Formation Alert (TCFA). Shortly after, the India Meteorological Department (IMD) declared that the disturbance developed into Depression BOB 01. A second TCFA was issued later that day as a new circulation associated with the system developed further towards the northeast. At 0600 UTC on May 18, the first advisory on Tropical Cyclone 01B was issued by the JTWC. The IMD also upgraded BOB 01 to a deep depression at this time.

Continuing on a northeasterly track, BOB 01 gradually intensified as it neared Bangladesh. About 12 hours after being designated a cyclone, it strengthened to the equivalent of a tropical storm. The winds had reached . An eye developed and the system made landfall several hours later near Chittagong. After making landfall, the storm quickly weakened, dissipating later that day.

Ahead of the storm, officials in Bangladesh relocated an estimated 650,000 people, resulting in a lower loss of life. But BOB 01 adversely affected low-lying areas, destroying 6,000 homes and damaging another 9,945. At least 35 people were killed by the storm and 504 others were injured. Five of the fatalities occurred in Chittagong and another five on an island in the Cox's Bazar District. Sixteen more of the fatalities occurred when three fishing vessels sank near Chittagong. Additionally, an estimated 4,000 fishermen were listed as missing at sea. A total of 108,440 people were affected in Bangladesh. An oil tanker anchored near Chittagong was tossed by rough seas into another vessel and sustained significant damage. Large quantities of crude oil spilled into the water due to a hole in the hull of the ship. Both of the ships involved in the incident were owned by the Bangladesh Shipping Corporation. Following the impacts of the storm, the United Nations Educational, Scientific and Cultural Organization provided $40,000 in immediate funds for rehabilitation efforts. The Government of Germany also provided $270,166 to the affected population. The International Federation of Red Cross and Red Crescent Societies donated about $1.2 million to Bangladesh.

Depression ARB 01 (02A) 

On May 27, an area of low pressure developed over the central Arabian Sea. The IMD only briefly monitored the system as a weak depression, designating it as ARB 01. Upon being classified a tropical cyclone, 02A reached its peak intensity. Soon, it began to dissipate due to increasing vertical wind shear. The center of circulation quickly became devoid of convection. The storm weakened below tropical storm intensity later that day before dissipating on May 29 over open waters.

Extremely Severe Cyclonic Storm ARB 02 (03A) 

On June 1, an area of low pressure developed over the Laccadive Islands. Two days later, the JTWC issued a TCFA for the system as it became better organized. Early on June 4, the JTWC issued its first advisory on Tropical Cyclone 03A. Around the same time, the IMD began monitoring the system as Depression ARB 02. Shortly after, the depression was upgraded to a deep depression and further strengthened into a cyclonic storm the following day. The small storm moved slowly towards the west and weakened as wind shear began to increase. The storm weakened below tropical storm intensity later that day and the initial final advisory was issued. However, the system redeveloped and advisories resumed the next day. The storm gradually intensified as it moved towards the northwest. The IMD also marked the increase in intensity, upgrading ARB 02 to a severe cyclonic storm. Around this time, the storm began to turn towards the north and accelerate due to an approaching mid-level trough. As the storm neared the Indian coastline, an eye developed and the storm strengthened into the equivalent of a major hurricane with winds reaching . Then it made landfall near Porbandar in the Indian state of Gujarat between 0100 and 0200 UTC. The storm weakened following landfall and the JTWC issued their final advisory later that day. The IMD continued to monitor ARB 02 until June 10, by which time it had weakened to a depression before dissipating.

An estimated 4,000 to 10,000 people were killed by the storm, many of whom were salt mine workers who did not own a radio and received little or no warning of the cyclone. The large loss of life was partially attributed to contractors who wanted to continue making profits and did not inform their workers of the approaching storm. According to the official figures, 1173 people died and 1774 people went missing. Also, the region had witnessed only 17 cyclones since 1890, all of which were weaker than 03A. As a result, its vulnerability was miscalculated by the local population and the disaster management administration. Power supply to numerous residences was lost due to the storms high winds. A microwave tower in Porbandar collapsed, causing widespread disruption in telecommunication. Hundreds of other power transmission towers also fell, causing an estimated loss of Rs 10 billion for the Gujarat Electricity Board. At least 893 people were injured by the storm and over 11,000 animals were killed. Over 162,000 structures were damaged or destroyed throughout the affected area and damages amounted to Rs. 120 billion (US$3 billion). Over the next one month, insurance companies had lost approximately Rs. 13 billion (US$266.5 million). The remnants of the storm produced heavy rains over Pakistan which electrocuted 12 people. In the wake of the storm, the United States Government provided US$25,000 for rehabilitation of the affected population. The Government of Denmark also contributed $72,992 in funds for relief efforts. The Gujarat government deployed approximately 330 medical teams to the affected areas.

Deep Depression BOB 02 

On June 13, the IMD began monitoring a depression over the central Bay of Bengal. Around 15:00 UTC on June 14, the deep depression made landfall near Visakhapatnam. Shortly thereafter, it weakened to a depression and dissipated early the following day.

Depression ARB 03 (04A) 

The system gradually intensified as it moved slowly towards the west. Early on September 30, the JTWC issued its first advisory on Tropical Cyclone 04A. Located within an area of moderate wind shear, the storm quickly weakened and dissipated early on October 1.

Deep Depression ARB 04 

Shortly after reaching its peak intensity, the depression weakened. The last advisory was issued the next day while the storm was over open waters.

Deep Depression BOB 03 

On October 13, the IMD began monitoring a tropical depression off the eastern coast of India. The depression remained relatively weak, with winds peaking at  before the storm made landfall near Narsapur in the Andhra Pradesh early on October 14. The depression dissipated shortly after landfall. Heavy rains produced by the depression damaged croplands and property. Twenty-four-hour rainfall totals reached  in localized areas, triggering flash floods in areas severely impacted by another system a week earlier. In Hyderabad, schools and government offices were closed. During the morning of October 14, overflow from a dam inundated the Srisailam power house, forcing officials to shut down the plant. Numerous highways were also closed due to flowing water. The following day, the water level of the dam continued to rise, leading to the evacuation of nearly 53,000 residents in the area. Throughout Andhra Pradesh, flooding from the depression resulted in 122 fatalities.

Cyclonic Storm ARB 05 (05A) 

The IMD began monitoring an area of low pressure over the Laccadive Islands on October 10. The low traveled towards the northwest with little development. On October 15, the JTWC issued a TCFA as the system became better organized. Although wind shear increased, the first advisory was issued the next day. With minimal convection, the storm never intensified past . The system traveled towards the northeast and weakened due to strong wind shear. On October 17, the storm fell below tropical storm status and made landfall on the Kathiawar Peninsula, near the same area where 03A made landfall in early June. The storm dissipated shortly after landfall.

As the storm neared land, officials in Gujarat evacuated hundreds of residents from coastal areas. Due to the low-intensity of the storm, no damage was reported on land and only light rain fell. However, offshore, more than 250 people were reported as missing when contact was lost with numerous fishing vessels. One-hundred-twenty people on twelve ships from Satpathy village were among the missing. One of the ships capsized; however, the crew of 12 swam to shore. One boat from Vasai carrying 20 people was also missing. Ten fishermen from Colaba were reported as missing, three of which later swam to shore. The Indian Coast Guard immediately dispatched search and rescue ships and naval helicopters to find the missing people.

Deep Depression BOB 04 

The depression strengthened to a deep depression later that day with winds peaking at  before undergoing a weakening trend. The depression dissipated the next day near the Andhra Pradesh coastline. The outer bands of the depression produced light rainfall over the coast of Andhra Pradesh.

Very Severe Cyclonic Storm BOB 05 (06B) 

On November 10, an area of low pressure developed over the Bay of Bengal within a monsoonal trough. Moving towards the northwest, the low gradually developed and the JTWC issued a TCFA early on November 13. The next day, the first advisory on Tropical Cyclone 06B was issued. A brief period of rapid development took place as the storm strengthened just below Category 1 status. Rapid weakening followed shortly after landfall and the storm dissipated early on November 16.

Major crop losses, property damage, and six fatalities were reported from the affected areas. Four of the fatalities were in Visakhapatnam and the other two were in east Godavari. Hundreds of trees and power lines had fallen. At least  of cropland and more than 2,000 homes were damaged. The storm dropped rainfall in excess of  throughout the region. Damages from the storm were estimated at BTN 880 million (US$20.7 million).

Very Severe Cyclonic Storm BOB 06 (07B) 

Tropical Storm Chip dissipated over Vietnam on November 15, 1998. The remnants of Chip crossed the Malay Peninsula on November 17 and entered the Bay of Bengal. The system moved along the edge of a subtropical ridge within an area of strong wind shear. After turning towards the northwest, the low entered an area of lower wind shear and began to become better organized. Between November 18 and 20, the JTWC issued three TCFAs before issuing first advisory on Tropical Cyclone 07B early on November 20. Shortly after reaching peak intensity, the cyclone entered an area of strong wind shear which caused convection associated with the storm to become dislocated from the center. This caused 07B to rapidly weaken before making landfall to the west of Chittagong, Bangladesh. It dissipated on November 23.

A large area of rice paddies was lost due to flooding and numerous homes were buried in mud. A total of 5,780 families were left homeless. About 8,755 homes sustained severe damage and an estimated 300,000 people were affected by 07B.

Severe Cyclonic Storm ARB 06 (08A) 

On December 7, a broad area of low pressure developed near southern India within an area of moderate wind shear. On December 11, the JTWC issued a TCFA for the system as it drifted towards the northwest over the Arabian Sea. Two days later, the first advisory on Tropical Cyclone 08A was issued. The large cyclone slowly organized and intensified as it turned towards the north. Then, it turned towards the west into an area of higher wind shear. The cyclone gradually weakened as it traveled towards Oman. Although it made landfall as a tropical storm, no known damage was reported. The remnants of the storm sank a ship, killing 18 fishermen.

Season effects 
This is a table of the storms in 1998 and their landfall(s), if any. Deaths in parentheses are additional and indirect (an example of an indirect death would be a traffic accident), but are still storm-related.

|-
| BOB 01 ||  || bgcolor=#| || bgcolor=#| || bgcolor=#| || West Bengal, Bangladesh || None || 35 ||
|-
| ARB 01 ||  || bgcolor=#| || bgcolor=#| || bgcolor=#|  || None || None || None ||
|-
| ARB 02 ||  || bgcolor=#| || bgcolor=#| || bgcolor=#| || India ||  || – ||
|-
| BOB 02 ||  || bgcolor=#| || bgcolor=#| || bgcolor=#| || None || None || None ||
|-
| ARB 03 ||  || bgcolor=#| || bgcolor=#| || bgcolor=#| || None || None || None ||
|-
| ARB 04 ||  || bgcolor=#| || bgcolor=#| || bgcolor=#| || None || None || None ||
|-
| ARB 05 ||  || bgcolor=#| || bgcolor=#| || bgcolor=#|  || India || None || None ||
|-
| BOB 03 ||  || bgcolor=#| || bgcolor=#| || bgcolor=#| || India || ||  ||
|-
| BOB 04 ||  || bgcolor=#| || bgcolor=#| || bgcolor=#| || Andrah Pradesh || || ||
|-
| BOB 05 ||  || bgcolor=#| || bgcolor=#| || bgcolor=#| || India ||  || 
|-
| BOB 06 ||  || bgcolor=#| || bgcolor=#| || bgcolor=#| || Bangladesh || || 40 ||
|-
| ARB 06 ||  || bgcolor=#| || bgcolor=#| || bgcolor=#| || Oman || || 18
|-

See also 

 1998 Atlantic hurricane season
 1998 Pacific hurricane season
 1998 Pacific typhoon season
 South-West Indian Ocean cyclone seasons: 1997–98, 1998–99
 Australian region cyclone seasons: 1997–98, 1998–99
 South Pacific cyclone seasons: 1997–98, 1998–99

References

External links 
 Primer for Parliamentarians
 Gary Padgett Summaries
 Unisys Track
 JTWC Archive

 
Articles which contain graphical timelines